M. S. Ramachandra Rao is an Institute Professor and professor of physics in the Department of Physics at the Indian Institute of Technology Madras.  In 2012, he received the Alexander von Humboldt fellowship. He is also an IOP editorial board member from 2009 onwards.

References

External links

Year of birth missing (living people)
Living people